Eulimastoma is a genus of sea snails, marine gastropod mollusks in the family Pyramidellidae, the pyrams and their allies.

Species
Species within the genus Eulimastoma include:
 Eulimastoma canaliculatum (C. B. Adams, 1850)
 Eulimastoma didymum (Verrill & Bush, 1900)
 Eulimastoma dotella (Dall & Bartsch, 1909)
 Eulimastoma engonium (Bush, 1885)
 Eulimastoma eutropia (Melvill, 1899)
 Eulimastoma exiguum Pimenta, 2012
 Eulimastoma franklini Pimenta, 2012
 Eulimastoma harbisonae Bartsch, 1955
 † Eulimastoma pyrgulopsis (Pilsbry & C. W. Johnson, 1917) 
 Eulimastoma surinamense Altena, 1975
 Eulimastoma weberi (Morrison, 1965)

References

 Landau B.M. & LaFollette P.I. (2015). The Pyramidellidae (Mollusca: Gastropoda) from the Miocene Cantaure Formation of Venezuela. Cainozoic Research. 15(1-2): 13-54.

External links
 https://www.biodiversitylibrary.org/page/1748610 
 To ITIS
 To World Register of Marine Species
  Pimenta A. D. & Absalão R. S. 2004. — Review of the genera Eulimastoma Bartsch, 1916 and Egila Dall & Bartsch, 1904 (Mollusca, Gastropoda, Pyramidellidae) from Brazil. Zoosystema 26 (2) : 157-173

Pyramidellidae